Vysshaya Liga (Russian and Belarusian) or  (Major League) may refer to:
Football
Soviet Top League
Russian Top League (1992–2000)
Ukrainian Premier League (1992–2008)
Belarusian Premier League (1992–present)
Azerbaijan Premier League
Tajikistan Higher League

Ice hockey
Supreme Hockey League
Ukrainian Hockey Championship
Vysshaya Liga (Belarus)
Vysshaya Liga (1992–2010)